The Little Blonde, Dead is a 1993 Dutch film directed by Jean van de Velde. It was based on a book of Boudewijn Büch. The film was selected as the Dutch entry for the Best Foreign Language Film at the 66th Academy Awards, but was not accepted as a nominee. It also won the Golden Calf by Best Feature Film.

Plot
Reckless poet Valentijn suddenly becomes a single father after an unexpected pregnancy.

Cast
 Antonie Kamerling as Valentijn Boecke
 Olivier Tuinier as Mickey
 Loes Wouterson as Mieke
 Gees Linnebank as Vader Boecke
 Liz Snoyink as Moeder Boecke
 Yoran Hensel as Jonge Valentijn
 Reinout Bussemaker as Harold
 Ellen Ten Damme as Dede
 Porgy Franssen as Arts Ziekenhuis
 Helen Kamperveen as Lucy de Jong
 Willemijn van der Ree as Verpleegster
 Ingeborg Elzevier as Gynaecoloog
 Pamela Teves as Juffrouw van Dalen
 Johan Ooms as Uitgever
 Gerard van Lennep as Uitgever

See also
 List of submissions to the 66th Academy Awards for Best Foreign Language Film
 List of Dutch submissions for the Academy Award for Best Foreign Language Film

References

External links
 
 
 

1993 films
Dutch drama films
1990s Dutch-language films
Films directed by Jean van de Velde
Films produced by Rob Houwer
Films shot in the Netherlands